Kiriyenko is a surname of Ukrainian origin. Alternative transliterations include Kirijenko/Kirienko, Kyriyenko/Kyrijenko/Kyrienko, and Kiryienka/Kiryjenka. Notable people with the surname include:

 Grigory Kiriyenko (born 1965), Russian fencer
 Ihor Kiriyenko (born 1986), Ukrainian footballer
 Sergey Kiriyenko (born 1962), former Prime Minister of Russia
 Valeri Kiriyenko (born 1965), Russian biathlete
 Vasil Kiryienka (born 1981), Belarusian cyclist
 Vladimir Kiriyenko (born 1983), Russian business executive
 Zinaida Kiriyenko (1933–2022), Russian actress and singer

See also
 

Ukrainian-language surnames